The 1960 Wisconsin gubernatorial election was held on November 8, 1960.   Democrat Gaylord Nelson won the election with 51.5% of the vote, retaining his position as Governor of Wisconsin.

However, the election was seen as a shock to Democrats, who lost in Racine, Sheboygan and Vilas counties (which were seen as generally blue areas) and were expecting a wider margin of victory. Nelson's 50,000-vote majority in Milwaukee County was credited as a key reason that the statewide result was not even closer.

Results

References 

1960
Wisconsin
November 1960 events in the United States
1960 Wisconsin elections